

Medicine
 approx. date – Establishment of St Thomas's Hospital Medical School in London.

Technology
 Commencement of laying out of gardens at the Villa d'Este, Tivoli, Italy, for Cardinal Ippolito II d'Este with sophisticated hydraulic features designed by Tommaso Chiruchi with Claude Venard.

Publications
 Gerolamo Cardano publishes his comprehensive survey of the natural sciences, De subtilitate, in Nuremberg.
 Giovanni Battista Ramusio begins publication of Navigationi et Viaggi ("Navigations and Travels"), a collection of explorers' first-hand accounts of their travels, the first work of its kind.

Births
 September 30 – Michael Maestlin, German astronomer and mathematician (died 1631)
 John Napier, Scottish mathematician (died 1617)
 Anselmus de Boodt, Flemish mineralogist and physician (died 1632)
 Jacques Guillemeau, French surgeon (died 1613)
 Ferrante Imperato, Neapolitan natural historian (died 1625)
 approximate date
 Willem Barentsz, Dutch explorer (died 1597)
 Marin le Bourgeoys, French inventor and artist (died c.1634)

Deaths
 Sulaiman Al Mahri, Arab navigator (born 1480 AD)

References

 
16th century in science
1550s in science